The Battle of Sangamner was fought between the Mughal Empire and Maratha Empire in 1679. This was the last battle in which the Maratha King Shivaji fought. The Mughals had ambushed Shivaji with a large force when he was returning from the sack of Jalna. The Marathas engaged in battle with the Mughals for three days and inflicted heavy casualties on the Mughals.

Shivaji successfully escaped with 500 soldiers a most of the plunder, while the combat continued until Maratha general, Sidhoji Nimbalkar was killed along with 2000 soldiers whereas Santaji Ghorpade retreated, with Hambir Rao injured and many Maratha soldiers arrested. Shivaji returned to Raigad safely early in December that year.

References

Sangamner
Sangamner
Sangamner
1679 in India